Mullah Noorullah Noori (born 1967) is the current Minister of Borders and Tribal Affairs of the Islamic Emirate of Afghanistan since 7 September 2021. He was also the Taliban's Governor of Balkh Province during their first administration (1996–2001). Noorullah Noori spent more than 12 years in extrajudicial detention in the United States's Guantanamo Bay detention camps, in Cuba. Noori was released from the detention camp on May 31, 2014, in a prisoner exchange that involved Bowe Bergdahl and the Taliban Five, and flown to Qatar.

2001 press reports describe General Rashid Dostum bringing Noori with him when he toured the ruins the Qala-i-Jangi fortress, after over 400 captives died there in what is usually described as a failed prison uprising. Noori was reported to have ordered the Taliban fighters in his jurisdiction to peacefully surrender to Dostum's Northern Alliance forces.

Noorullah Noori arrived at Guantanamo on January 11, 2002, and was held there for 12 years. The allegations used to justify his detention in Guantanamo asserted he was an interim Provincial Governor of Jalalabad, temporary governor of Mazari Sharif and Governor of Balkh Province. Noorullah has been listed by the United Nations 1267 Committee since January 25, 2001.

Throughout the fall of 2011 and the winter of 2012, the United States conducted peace negotiations with the Taliban and widely leaked was that a key sticking point was the ongoing detention of Noorullah and four other senior Taliban. Negotiations hinged on a proposal to send the five men directly to Doha, Qatar, where they would be allowed to set up an official office for the Taliban.

Governor under the Taliban

Farida Kuchi, a Kuchi nomad tribeswoman who ran as a candidate for the Wolesi Jirga in 2005, described her delivery of a list of 1000 Kuchi stranded in an impromptu refugee camp to then Governor of Balkh Noori as the beginning of her political activism in 1998. Fareeda told Carlotta Gall, of the New York Times that Noori accepted her list, and forwarded to humanitarian agencies, and aid did arrive.

In the fall of 2001, when the United States, allied with the Northern Alliance and other anti-Taliban forces, started to use military force to seek out al Qaeda, Noori was one Taliban leader who is reported to have directed the Taliban fighters in his province to lay down their weapons and surrender.

In December 2001, shortly after the overthrow of the Taliban, Human Rights Watch called for a human rights tribunal to be convened against Noorullah and two other former Taliban Governors of Northern Provinces to investigate claims they had been responsible for alleged massacres of Hazara and Uzbek civilians. The reports of civilian massacres were alleged to have occurred during the previous three years (1998-2001). The two other Taliban leaders were Mullah Dadullah and Mullah Mohammed Fazil. Fazil, like Noorullah, had already surrendered and would be sent to Guantanamo.

Held aboard the USS Bataan

Former Taliban Ambassador to Pakistan Abdul Salam Zaeef described being flown to the United States Navy's amphibious warfare vessel, the USS Bataan, for special interrogation. Zaeef wrote that the cells were located six decks down, were only 1 meter by 2 meters. He wrote that the captives weren't allowed to speak with one another, but that he "eventually saw that Mullahs Fazal, Noori, Burhan, Wasseeq Sahib and Rohani were all among the other prisoners." Historian Andy Worthington, author of The Guantanamo Files, identified Noori as one of the men Zaeef recognized. He identified Mullah Wasseeq as Abdul-Haq Wasiq, Mullah Rohani as Gholam Ruhani and Mullah Fazal as Mohammed Fazil.

Combatant Status Review Tribunal

Initially, the Bush administration asserted that they could withhold all the protections of the Geneva Conventions to captives from the war on terror. This policy was challenged before the Judicial branch. Critics argued that the U.S. could not evade its obligation to conduct competent tribunals to determine whether captives are, or are not, entitled to the protections of prisoner of war status.

Subsequently, the Department of Defense instituted the Combatant Status Review Tribunals. The Tribunals, however, were not authorized to determine whether the captives were lawful combatants—rather they were merely empowered to make a recommendation as to whether the captive had previously been correctly determined to match the Bush administration's definition of an enemy combatant.

Summary of Evidence memo
A Summary of Evidence memo was prepared for Mullah Noorullah Noori's Combatant Status Review Tribunal, on August 8, 2004. The memo listed the following allegations against him:

Transcript
Noori chose to participate in his Combatant Status Review Tribunal. On March 3, 2006, in response to a court order from Jed Rakoff the Department of Defense published a five-page summarized transcript from his Combatant Status Review Tribunal.

Administrative Review Board hearing

Detainees who were determined to have been properly classified as "enemy combatants" were scheduled to have their dossier reviewed at annual Administrative Review Board hearings. The Administrative Review Boards weren't authorized to review whether a detainee qualified for POW status and they weren't authorized to review whether a detainee should have been classified as an "enemy combatant".

They were authorized to consider whether a detainee should continue to be detained by the United States because they continued to pose a threat—or whether they could safely be repatriated to the custody of their home country, or whether they could be set free.

First annual Administrative Review Board
A Summary of Evidence memo was prepared for Noorullah Noori's first annual Administrative Review Board.

The following primary factors favor continued detention

The following primary factors favor release or transfer

Transcript
Noori chose to participate in his Administrative Review Board hearing.

Second annual Administrative Review Board
A Summary of Evidence memo was prepared for Noorullah Noori's second annual Administrative Review Board.

Third annual Administrative Review Board
A Summary of Evidence memo was prepared for Norullah Noori's third annual Administrative Review Board.

The following primary factors favor continued detention

The following primary factors favor release or transfer

Board recommendations
In early September 2007, the Department of Defense released two heavily redacted memos from this board to Gordon R. England, the Designated Civilian Official. The review board convened on January 31, 2007. The board's recommendation was unanimous but was also redacted. The Board's recommendation was forwarded to England on March 29, 2007, and England authorized his continued detention on April 2, 2007.

Writ of habeas corpus
Noorullah Noori had a writ of habeas corpus, Civil Action No. 08-cv-1828, filed on his behalf in late 2008 before US District Court Judge Ricardo M. Urbina. On December 17, 2008, Patricia A. Sullivan filed a "status report" on his behalf. She reported that Noorullah Noori had a DTA appeal filed on his behalf in 2007.

Joint Review Task Force

When he assumed office in January 2009, President Barack Obama made a number of promises about the future of Guantanamo. He promised the use of torture would cease at the camp and also promised to institute a new review system. That new review system was composed of officials from six departments, where the OARDEC reviews were conducted entirely by the Department of Defense. When it reported back a year later, the Joint Review Task Force classified some individuals as too dangerous to be transferred from Guantanamo. On April 9, 2013, that document was made public after a Freedom of Information Act request. Noorullah Noori was one of the 71 individuals deemed too innocent to charge, but too dangerous to release. Although Obama promised that those deemed too innocent to charge but too dangerous to release would start to receive reviews from a Periodic Review Board, less than a quarter of men have received a review.

Release negotiations

Most Afghans who had been held in detention at the U.S. facility had been repatriated to Afghanistan by 2009. Negotiations hinged on a proposal to send the five men directly to Doha, Qatar, where they would be allowed to set up an official office for the Taliban.

In March 2012, it was reported that Ibrahim Spinzada, described as "Karzai's top aide" had spoken with the five men in Guantanamo earlier that month and had secured their agreement to be transferred to Qatar. Karzai, who had initially opposed the transfer, then reportedly backed the plan. It was reported that U.S. officials stated the Obama administration had not yet agreed to transfer the five men.

Release from Guantanamo Bay
Noori and four other prisoners who were known as the Taliban five were released from Guantanamo Bay and flown by U.S. military C-17 aircraft into Qatar on June 1, 2014, where they were set free. Their release was in exchange for that of U.S. soldier Bowe Bergdahl who had been captured in Afghanistan five years earlier. The exchange was brokered by the Emir of Qatar. Noori and the others were required to stay in Qatar for 12 months as a condition of their release. Upon his release, the Taliban confirmed that Noori was eager to resume his efforts to kill Americans. "After arriving in Qatar, Noorullah Noori kept insisting he would go to Afghanistan and fight American forces there," a Taliban commander told reporters.

References

External links
 Who Are the Remaining Prisoners in Guantánamo? Part Two: Captured in Afghanistan (2001) Andy Worthington, September 17, 2010

Detainees of the Guantanamo Bay detention camp
Afghan extrajudicial prisoners of the United States
Living people
1967 births
Governors of Balkh Province
Taliban leaders
Taliban government ministers of Afghanistan